Anarchist law is a body of norms regarding behavior and decision-making operative within in an anarchist community. The term is used in a series of ongoing debates within the various branches of anarchist theory regarding if and how norms of individual and/or collective behavior and decision-making should be created and enforced. Although many anarchists would consider "anarchist law" simply synonymous with natural law, others contend law in anarchy would have additional, unique elements. Over the course of the last two hundred years as anarchism has grown and evolved to include diverse strains, there have been different conceptions of "anarchist law" produced and discussed, or used in practice by anarchist networks such as Peoples' Global Action or Indymedia.

Non-coercion 

The most fundamental maxim of many anarchist tendencies is that no individual has the right to coerce another individual, and that everyone has the right to defend themselves against coercion (the non-aggression principle or zero aggression principle). Systems typically considered coercive include the state, capitalism, and institutional oppression. This basic principle, like mutual aid, is foundational to much of anarchist law, and indeed much of anarchist theory. Peter Kropotkin, a prominent anarcho-communist, stated it was "best summed up by the maxim 'do unto others as you would have them do unto you.'" In short, anarchist philosophy includes the "ethic of reciprocity," but typically condones violence intended to retaliate against or dismantle systems of oppression (with the exception of anarcho-pacifism, some Christian anarchism and other nonviolent/pacifistic movements.)

Consensus-based social contracts 

Since the principle of non-coercion makes hierarchical state structures unfeasible, anarchist communities must find an alternative basis for setting the rules of engagement within a collective. Accordingly, virtually all anarchist legal models begin with the assumption that whatever rules are set in place must be freely agreed to by the entirety of the community that is to be governed by them in a setting free from coercion or intimidation. Such freely given consent constitutes a social contract, though the exact nature of such contracts is a matter of heated debate.

Some anarchist legal theorists hold that an ideal anarchist society should be based strictly on natural law and mutual aid, which require no social contract.

However, many anarchist theorists completely reject the concept of natural law as coercive and man-made. Natural law in this view is merely disguising authoritarianism so the oppressor does not have to take credit for it. Social anarchists, mutualists and many individualist anarchists reject private property, a core principle of most natural law theories.

Free association 

Free association (also called voluntary association) also implies the right of individuals to form those exact social contracts. This freedom to not associate means if the terms of a social contract become unacceptable to an individual member or sub-group(s) within a society, the discontented have the right to secede from the contract. They may also form new associations with others that more closely fit their needs.

Mutual aid 

The principle of mutual aid, originally identified by Peter Kropotkin as arising from natural law, is that since evolution occurs in groupsnot individualsit is evolutionarily advantageous for members of a community to assist each other. The anarchist approach to building powerand structuring power relationshipsis derived from this evolutionary and biological imperative. In a nutshell the argument is that since individuals require the assistance of groups to self-actualize, individuals have a strong self-interest in the good of the community to which they belong.  It follows that (freely associating) collectives of individuals working for mutual improvement and mutual goals must form the basis of any anarchist society, thus providing the sociological and economic imperative for the creation of social contracts capable of binding these self-selecting groups together.

In a pre-revolutionary situation, the principle of "mutual aid" is the moral imperative that drives efforts by contemporary anarchists to provide material aid to victims of natural disasters; those that are homeless or poor, and others who have been left without access to food or clean drinking water, or other basic necessities.

Enforceability 

Enforceability is one of the most controversial areas of anarchist law. Early writers such as Proudhon argued that it was legitimate for working-class people to self-organize against criminals who prey on the weak, a process which would unequivocally entail some degree of coercion.

Decision-making 

Common techniques for decision-making, including decisions about the de facto laws themselves, among non-hierarchical societies include various forms of formal consensus, supermajority voting, "consensus minus one" and direct democracy. Anthropologist David Graeber argues that any community that lacks a centralized mechanism of force (a state) will naturally gravitate toward some form of consensus decision-making.

Examples

See also 
Voluntary association
Polycentric law
Privatization in criminal justice
An Anarchist FAQ

References

Further reading

External links 
 Anarchist Studies Network Reading List on Anarchism & Law. Archived 22 May 2019.

Issues in anarchism
Philosophy of law